Janusz Gol (born 11 November 1985) is a Polish professional footballer who plays as a central midfielder for I liga club Arka Gdynia.

Career

Club
Having begun his playing career with local side Polonia Świdnica, Gol moved to GKS Bełchatów during the summer transfer window of 2008. He extended his contract with GKS to the end of 2010/2011 season a year later in June 2009.

At the end of his contract he joined Legia Warsaw on a three and a half year contract in February 2011.

In July 2013, he joined Russian side FC Amkar Perm on a two year contract.

Following not re-signing for Amkar, Gol returned to his homeland to play for KS Cracovia.

In August 2020, Gol signed a two-year contract with Romanian side Dinamo București.

International
He has been a part of the Poland national football team since 2010.

International stats

Career statistics

Club

Notes

Honours

Legia Warsaw
 Ekstraklasa: 2012–13
 Polish Cup: 2010–11, 2011–12, 2012–13

KS Cracovia
 Polish Cup: 2019–20

References

External links
 
 

1985 births
Living people
People from Świdnica
Sportspeople from Lower Silesian Voivodeship
Polish footballers
Poland international footballers
Association football midfielders
GKS Bełchatów players
Legia Warsaw players
MKS Cracovia (football) players
FC Amkar Perm players
FC Dinamo București players
Górnik Łęczna players
Arka Gdynia players
Ekstraklasa players
Russian Premier League players
Liga I players
Polish expatriate footballers
Expatriate footballers in Russia
Expatriate footballers in Romania
Polish expatriate sportspeople in Russia
Polish expatriate sportspeople in Romania